The arrondissement of Moulins is an arrondissement of France in the Allier department in the Auvergne-Rhône-Alpes region. It has 109 communes.

Composition

The communes of the arrondissement of Moulins, and their INSEE codes, are:

 Agonges (03002)
 Aubigny (03009)
 Aurouër (03011)
 Autry-Issards (03012)
 Avermes (03013)
 Bagneux (03015)
 Barberier (03016)
 Bayet (03018)
 Beaulon (03019)
 Bessay-sur-Allier (03025)
 Besson (03026)
 Bourbon-l'Archambault (03036)
 Bransat (03038)
 Bresnay (03039)
 Bressolles (03040)
 Buxières-les-Mines (03046)
 Cesset (03049)
 Chantelle (03053)
 Chapeau (03054)
 La Chapelle-aux-Chasses (03057)
 Chareil-Cintrat (03059)
 Charroux (03062)
 Chassenard (03063)
 Château-sur-Allier (03064)
 Châtel-de-Neuvre (03065)
 Châtillon (03069)
 Chemilly (03073)
 Chevagnes (03074)
 Chézy (03076)
 Contigny (03083)
 Coulandon (03085)
 Coulanges (03086)
 Couleuvre (03087)
 Couzon (03090)
 Cressanges (03092)
 Deneuille-lès-Chantelle (03096)
 Deux-Chaises (03099)
 Diou (03100)
 Dompierre-sur-Besbre (03102)
 Étroussat (03112)
 La Ferté-Hauterive (03114)
 Fleuriel (03115)
 Fourilles (03116)
 Franchesse (03117)
 Gannay-sur-Loire (03119)
 Garnat-sur-Engièvre (03120)
 Gennetines (03121)
 Gipcy (03122)
 Gouise (03124)
 Laféline (03134)
 Limoise (03146)
 Loriges (03148)
 Louchy-Montfand (03149)
 Lurcy-Lévis (03155)
 Lusigny (03156)
 Marcenat (03160)
 Marigny (03162)
 Meillard (03169)
 Meillers (03170)
 Mercy (03171)
 Molinet (03173)
 Monétay-sur-Allier (03176)
 Monétay-sur-Loire (03177)
 Montbeugny (03180)
 Le Montet (03183)
 Montilly (03184)
 Montord (03188)
 Moulins (03190)
 Neuilly-le-Réal (03197)
 Neure (03198)
 Neuvy (03200)
 Noyant-d'Allier (03202)
 Paray-le-Frésil (03203)
 Paray-sous-Briailles (03204)
 Pierrefitte-sur-Loire (03207)
 Pouzy-Mésangy (03210)
 Rocles (03214)
 Saint-Aubin-le-Monial (03218)
 Saint-Ennemond (03229)
 Saint-Gérand-de-Vaux (03234)
 Saint-Germain-de-Salles (03237)
 Saint-Hilaire (03238)
 Saint-Léopardin-d'Augy (03241)
 Saint-Martin-des-Lais (03245)
 Saint-Menoux (03247)
 Saint-Plaisir (03251)
 Saint-Pourçain-sur-Besbre (03253)
 Saint-Pourçain-sur-Sioule (03254)
 Saint-Sornin (03260)
 Saint-Voir (03263)
 Saligny-sur-Roudon (03265)
 Saulcet (03267)
 Souvigny (03275)
 Taxat-Senat (03278)
 Le Theil (03281)
 Thiel-sur-Acolin (03283)
 Toulon-sur-Allier (03286)
 Treban (03287)
 Trévol (03290)
 Tronget (03292)
 Ussel-d'Allier (03294)
 Vaumas (03300)
 Verneuil-en-Bourbonnais (03307)
 Le Veurdre (03309)
 Vieure (03312)
 Villeneuve-sur-Allier (03316)
 Voussac (03319)
 Ygrande (03320)
 Yzeure (03321)

History

The arrondissement of Moulins was created in 1800. At the January 2017 reorganization of the arrondissements of Allier, it lost three communes to the arrondissement of Vichy and gained one commune from the arrondissement of Vichy.

As a result of the reorganisation of the cantons of France which came into effect in 2015, the borders of the cantons are no longer related to the borders of the arrondissements. The cantons of the arrondissement of Moulins were, as of January 2015:

 Bourbon-l'Archambault
 Chantelle
 Chevagnes
 Dompierre-sur-Besbre
 Lurcy-Lévis
 Le Montet
 Moulins-Ouest
 Moulins-Sud
 Neuilly-le-Réal
 Saint-Pourçain-sur-Sioule
 Souvigny
 Yzeure

References

Moulins